Humanos (Portuguese for Humans) is a musical band from Portugal formed in 2004. The idea behind it was to bring to light some unreleased songs by an iconic Portuguese artist, a singer-songwriter from the 1980s, António Variações.

David Fonseca, Manuela Azevedo (the lead singer of another Portuguese music group, Clã), Camané (one of the most famous Portuguese fadistas), Sérgio Nascimento (a member of Sérgio Godinho’s band), Hélder Gonçalves (also from Clã), Nuno Rafael and João Cardoso are the seven members of a group responsible for what became an unmatched success at that point in the Portuguese music scene.

The homonymous album Humanos scored quintuple platinum status, staying for weeks in #1. "Muda de Vida", "Maria Albertina" and "Rugas" are just some of the group hits.

All this culminated in three sold-out concerts, two of them in Coliseu dos Recreios (Lisbon) and the other in Porto. There was also another memorable performance, in front of a crowd of 40,000 people, at the Festival do Sudoeste Portuguese summer music festival, in 2005.

Humanos however was a short-lived project, as there were few unreleased António Variações’ songs. Thus, the release, in November 2006, of a CD and a DVD recorded at the Coliseu concerts, marked the end of the Humanos project.

All songs by Humanos were written by António Variações who recorded them as demos only and kept them in a shoe box, found after his death.

Discography

Humanos 
Debut album released in 2004. Lyrcs and music is by António Variações

A Teia  	
Quero É Viver 	
Muda De Vida 	
Na Lama 	
A Culpa É Da Vontade 	
Maria Albertina 	
Rugas 	
Gelado De Verão 	
Amor De Conserva 	
Já Não Sou Quem Era 	
Não Me Consumas 	
Adeus Que Me Vou Embora

Humanos ao Vivo
Live album released in 2006. Lyrcs and music is by António Variações

CD
Na Lama 	
A Culpa É Da Vontade 	
A Teia
Estou Além
Maria Albertina 	
Já Não Sou Quem Era 	
Adeus Que Me Vou Embora
Anjinho da Guarda
Amor De Conserva 	
O Corpo é que Paga
Gelado De Verão 	
Hardcore (1º Escalão)
Rugas 	
Eu Estava a Pensar Agora Em Ti
Não Me Consumas 	
Quero É Viver
Muda De Vida

DVD 1
2005: Concerto at the Coliseu dos Recreios
It contains a documentary Humanos - A Vida de Variações and videos "Muda De Vida", "Maria Albertina", "Quero Viver"

DVD 2
2005: Humanos in Festival Sudoeste''

Credits
Both studio album and live album as well as DVDs credited to:
Camané - vocals
David Fonseca - vocals and guitar
Manuela Azevedo - vocals
Hélder Gonçalves - bass and guitar
Nuno Rafael - guitar
João Cardoso - piano and keyboards
Sérgio Nascimento - drums and percussion
Maria Alejandra Ordoñez Ocampo - vocals

Chart performance

References

External links 
humanos.sapo.pt, Official Website
Facebook page

Portuguese musical groups